Ozalj Castle ( or Gradina Ozalj) is a castle in the town of Ozalj, Croatia.

The Ozalj fortress, located on the stone cliff perched above the Kupa River, is one of the best-known fortifications of this type in Croatia. It is a very old stronghold (first mentioned in 1244) that has been converted into a castle. The popularity of this castle is because this was the joint castle of the Croatian noble families of Frankopan and Zrinski. In fact, it was the scene of the ill-fated Zrinski–Frankopan conspiracy, which significantly marked the history of Croatia. In the castle there is a museum and a library, and it is in a relatively good state of repair.

See also 

Frankopan
Zrinski
Zrinski–Frankopan conspiracy

References

 

Castles in Croatia
Museums in Croatia
Frankopan family
Zrinski
Buildings and structures in Karlovac County
Tourist attractions in Karlovac County
Castle museums